Adhemar Santillo (13 November 1939 – 9 March 2021) was a Brazilian politician and businessman.

Biography
Ademar was the son of Virgínio Santillo and Elídya Maschietto Santillo. Born in Ribeirão Preto, his family settled in Anápolis in 1942. He was elected to the Legislative Assembly of Goiás in 1970.

A member of the Chamber of Deputies from 1975 to 1986, he joined the restructured Brazilian Democratic Movement (PMDB) alongside his brother, Senator . For seven months, he was a member of the Workers' Party but later returned to the PMDB. In 1985, he was elected Mayor of Anápolis and joined the Social Democratic Party (PSD) due to a disagreement with prominent PMDB member . He left the office in 1989, returning in 1997 after defeating his brother. He was not reelected in 2002 and subsequently retired from politics.

Adhemar Santillo died of a pulmonary embolism in Anápolis on 9 March 2021, at the age of 81. Three months earlier, Santillo tested positive for COVID-19.

References

1939 births
2021 deaths
People from Ribeirão Preto
Members of the Chamber of Deputies (Brazil) from Goiás
Members of the Legislative Assembly of Goiás
Mayors of places in Brazil
Deaths from pulmonary embolism
20th-century Brazilian politicians
Brazilian Democratic Movement politicians
Social Democratic Party (Brazil, 1945–65) politicians
Brazilian Social Democracy Party politicians
People from Anápolis
Deaths from the COVID-19 pandemic in Goiás

Brazilian people of Italian descent